In additive number theory, Fermat's theorem on sums of two squares states that an odd prime p can be expressed as:

with x and y integers, if and only if

The prime numbers for which this is true are called Pythagorean primes.
For example, the primes 5, 13, 17, 29, 37 and 41 are all congruent to 1 modulo 4, and they can be expressed as sums of two squares in the following ways:

On the other hand, the primes 3, 7, 11, 19, 23 and 31 are all congruent to 3 modulo 4, and none of them can be expressed as the sum of two squares. This is the easier part of the theorem, and follows immediately from the observation that all squares are congruent to 0 or 1 modulo 4.

Since the Diophantus identity implies that the product of two integers each of which can be written as the sum of two squares is itself expressible as the sum of two squares, by applying Fermat's theorem to the prime factorization of any positive integer n, we see that if all  the prime factors of n congruent to 3 modulo 4 occur to an even exponent, then n is expressible as a sum of two squares. The converse also holds. This generalization of Fermat's theorem is known as the sum of two squares theorem.

History 
Albert Girard was the first to make the observation, describing all positive integer numbers (not necessarily primes) expressible as the sum of two squares of positive integers; this was published in 1625. The statement that every prime p of the form 4n+1 is the sum of two squares is sometimes called Girard's theorem. For his part, Fermat wrote an elaborate version of the statement (in which he also gave the number of possible expressions of the powers of p as a sum of two squares)  in a letter to Marin Mersenne dated December 25, 1640: for this reason this version of the theorem is sometimes called Fermat's Christmas theorem.

Gaussian primes
Fermat's theorem on sums of two squares is strongly related with the theory of Gaussian primes.

The norm  of a Gaussian integer is an integer equal to the square of the absolute value of the Gaussian integer. The norm of a product of Gaussian integers is the product of their norms. This is the Diophantus identity, which results immediately from the similar property of the absolute value.

Gaussian integers form a principal ideal domain.

The multiplicative property of the norm implies that a prime number  is either a Gaussian prime or the norm of a Gaussian prime. Fermat's theorem asserts that the first case occurs when  and that the second case occurs when  and  The last case is not considered in Fermat's statement, but is trivial, as

Related results
Above point of view on Fermat's theorem is a special case of the theory of factorization of ideals in rings of quadratic integers. Moreover, the law of quadratic reciprocity allows distinguishing the two cases in terms of congruences. If  is a principal ideal domain, then  is an ideal norm if and only 

In a letter to Blaise Pascal dated September 25,  1654 Fermat announced the following two results that are essentially the special cases  and  If  is an odd prime, then

Fermat wrote also:
 If two primes which end in 3 or 7 and surpass by 3 a multiple of 4 are multiplied, then their product will be composed of a square and the quintuple of another square.
Euler later extended this to the conjecture that

Both Fermat's assertion and Euler's conjecture were established by Joseph-Louis Lagrange. This more complicated formulation relies on the fact that  is not a principal ideal domain, unlike  and

Algorithm
If this the case, one has got the decomposition.

So the computational complexity of this algorithm is exponential.

An algorithm with a polynomial complexity has been described by
Stan Wagon in 1990, based on work by Serret and Hermite (1848), and Cornacchia (1908).

Description 
Given an odd prime  in the form , first find  such that .
This can be done by finding a Quadratic non-residue modulo , say , and letting
. 

Such an  will satisfy the condition since quadratic non-residues satisfy .

Then it will be the case that .

Example 
Take . A possible quadratic non-residue for 97 is 13, since . so we let .
The Euclidean algorithm applied to 97 and 22 yields:

The first two remainders smaller than the square root of 97 are 9 and 4; and indeed we have , as expected.

Proofs
Fermat usually did not write down proofs of his claims, and he did not provide a proof of this statement. The first proof was found by Euler after much effort and is based on infinite descent.  He announced it in two letters to Goldbach, on May 6, 1747 and on April 12, 1749; he published the detailed proof in two articles (between 1752 and 1755).  Lagrange gave a proof in 1775 that was based on his study of quadratic forms. This proof was simplified by Gauss in his Disquisitiones Arithmeticae (art. 182). Dedekind gave at least two proofs based on the arithmetic of the Gaussian integers. There is an elegant proof using Minkowski's theorem about convex sets. Simplifying an earlier short proof due to Heath-Brown (who was inspired by Liouville's idea), Zagier presented a non-constructive one-sentence proof in 1990.
And more recently Christopher gave a  partition-theoretic proof.

Euler's proof by infinite descent
Euler succeeded in proving Fermat's theorem on sums of two squares in 1749, when he was forty-two years old. He communicated this in a letter to Goldbach dated 12 April 1749. The proof relies on infinite descent, and is only briefly sketched in the letter. The full proof consists in five steps and is published in two papers. The first four steps are Propositions 1 to 4 of the first paper and do not correspond exactly to the four steps below. The fifth step below is from the second paper.

For the avoidance of ambiguity, zero will always be a valid possible constituent of "sums of two squares", so for example every square of an integer is trivially expressible as the sum of two squares by setting one of them to be zero.

1. The product of two numbers, each of which is a sum of two squares, is itself a sum of two squares.
This is a well-known property, based on the identity

due to Diophantus.

2. If a number which is a sum of two squares is divisible by a prime which is a sum of two squares, then the quotient is a sum of two squares.
(This is Euler's first Proposition).

Then  divides

Since  is a prime, it divides one of the two factors. Suppose that it divides . Since

(Diophantus's identity) it follows that  must divide . Dividing the expression by  yields:

and thus expresses the quotient as a sum of two squares, as claimed.

On the other hand if  divides , a similar argument holds by using the following variant of Diophantus's identity:

3. If a number which can be written as a sum of two squares is divisible by a number which is not a sum of two squares, then the quotient has a factor which is not a sum of two squares. (This is Euler's second Proposition).
Suppose  is a number not expressible as a sum of two squares, which divides . Write the quotient, factored into its (possibly repeated) prime factors, as  so that . If we get all the way down to  then  itself would have to be equal to the sum of two squares, which is a contradiction. So at least one of the primes  is not the sum of two squares.

4.
(This is the step that uses step (3.) to produce an 'infinite descent' and was Euler's Proposition 4. The proof sketched below also includes the proof of his Proposition 3).

Let  be relatively prime positive integers: without loss of generality  is not itself prime, otherwise there is nothing to prove. Again, we lose nothing by assuming  since the case  is obvious.

Multiplying out we obtain

uniquely defining a non-negative integer . Since  divides both ends of this equation sequence it follows that  must also be divisible by : say .

Since such an infinite descent is impossible, we conclude that  must be expressible as a sum of two squares, as claimed.

5. Every prime of the form  is a sum of two squares.
(This is the main result of Euler's second paper).

If , then by Fermat's Little Theorem each of the numbers  is congruent to one modulo . Each of these differences can be factored as

Since  is prime, it must divide one of the two factors. So it is enough to show that  cannot always divide the second factor. If it divides all  differences , then it would divide all  differences of successive terms, all  differences of the differences, and so forth. Therefore,  cannot divide all the second factors which proves that  is indeed the sum of two squares.

Lagrange's proof through quadratic forms
Lagrange completed a proof in 1775 based on his general theory of integral quadratic forms. The following presentation incorporates a slight simplification of his argument, due to Gauss, which appears in article 182 of the Disquisitiones Arithmeticae.

An (integral binary) quadratic form is an expression of the form  with  integers. A number  is said to be represented by the form if there exist integers  such that . Fermat's theorem on sums of two squares is then equivalent to the statement that a prime  is represented by the form  (i.e.) exactly when  is congruent to  modulo .

The discriminant of the quadratic form is defined to be .

 
 
with  such that, when substituted into the first form, yield the second. Equivalent forms are readily seen to have the same discriminant, and hence also the same parity for the middle coefficient , which coincides with the parity of the discriminant. Moreover, it is clear that equivalent forms will represent exactly the same integers, because these kind of substitutions can be reversed by substitutions of the same kind.

Lagrange proved that all positive definite forms of discriminant −4 are equivalent. Thus, to prove Fermat's theorem it is enough to find any positive definite form of discriminant −4 that represents . For example, one can use a form

Of course, the coefficient  must be an integer, so the problem is reduced to finding some integer m such that  divides : or in other words, a  'square root of -1 modulo ' .

Firstly it follows from Euclid's Fundamental Theorem of Arithmetic that . Consequently, : that is,  are their own inverses modulo  and this property is unique to them. Let : from what has just been observed, .

Dedekind's two proofs using Gaussian integers
Richard Dedekind gave at least two proofs of Fermat's theorem on sums of two squares, both using the arithmetical properties of the Gaussian integers, which are numbers of the form a + bi, where a and b are integers, and i is the square root of −1. One appears in section 27 of his exposition of ideals published in 1877; the second appeared in Supplement XI to Peter Gustav Lejeune Dirichlet's Vorlesungen über Zahlentheorie, and was published in 1894.

1. First proof. If  is an odd prime number, then we have  in the Gaussian integers. Consequently, writing a Gaussian integer ω = x + iy with x,y ∈ Z and applying the Frobenius automorphism in Z[i]/(p), one finds

since the automorphism fixes the elements of Z/(p). In the current case,  for some integer n, and so in the above expression for ωp, the exponent (p-1)/2 of -1 is even. Hence the right hand side equals ω, so in this case the Frobenius endomorphism of Z[i]/(p) is the identity.

Kummer had already established that if } is the order of the Frobenius automorphism of Z[i]/(p), then the ideal  in Z[i] would be a product of 2/f distinct prime ideals. (In fact, Kummer had established a much more general result for any extension of Z obtained by adjoining a primitive m-th root of unity, where m was any positive integer; this is the case  of that result.) Therefore, the ideal (p) is the product of two different prime ideals in Z[i]. Since the Gaussian integers are a Euclidean domain for the norm function , every ideal is principal and generated by a nonzero element of the ideal of minimal norm.

2. Second proof. This proof builds on Lagrange's result that if  is a prime number, then there must be an integer m such that  is divisible by p (we can also see this by Euler's criterion); it also uses the fact that the Gaussian integers are a unique factorization domain (because they are a Euclidean domain). This immediately yields that .

Proof by Minkowski's Theorem
For  congruent to  mod  a prime,  is a quadratic residue mod  by Euler's criterion. Therefore, there exists an integer  such that  divides . Consider the lattice . If  then . Thus  divides  for any .

Furthermore,  is convex and symmetrical about the origin. Therefore, by Minkowski's theorem there exists a nonzero vector  such that . Both  and  so .

Zagier's "one-sentence proof"
Let  be prime, let  denote the natural numbers (with or without zero), and consider the finite set  of triples of numbers.
 
which has exactly one fixed point . Hence,  has also a fixed point with respect to the obvious involution.

This proof, due to Zagier, is a simplification of an earlier proof by Heath-Brown, which in turn was inspired by a proof of Liouville. The technique of the proof is a combinatorial analogue of the topological principle that the Euler characteristics of a topological space with an involution and of its fixed-point set have the same parity and is reminiscent of the use of sign-reversing involutions in the proofs of combinatorial bijections.

This proof is equivalent to a geometric or "visual" proof using "windmill" figures, given by Alexander Spivak in 2006 and described in this MathOverflow post and this Mathologer YouTube video .

Proof with partition theory
In 2016, A. David Christopher gave a partition-theoretic proof by considering partitions of the odd prime  having exactly two sizes , each occurring exactly  times, and by showing that at least one such partition exists if  is congruent to 1 modulo 4.

See also
 Legendre's three-square theorem
 Lagrange's four-square theorem
 Landau–Ramanujan constant
 Thue's lemma
 Friedlander–Iwaniec theorem

References

*Richard Dedekind, The theory of algebraic integers.
L. E. Dickson. History of the Theory of Numbers Vol. 2. Chelsea Publishing Co., New York 1920
Harold M. Edwards, Fermat's Last Theorem. A genetic introduction to algebraic number theory. Graduate Texts in Mathematics no. 50, Springer-Verlag, NY, 1977.
C. F. Gauss, Disquisitiones Arithmeticae (English Edition). Transl. by Arthur A. Clarke. Springer-Verlag, 1986.

D. R. Heath-Brown, Fermat's two squares theorem. Invariant, 11 (1984) pp. 3–5.
John Stillwell, Introduction to Theory of Algebraic Integers by Richard Dedekind. Cambridge Mathematical Library, Cambridge University Press, 1996.  
Don Zagier, A one-sentence proof that every prime p ≡ 1 mod 4 is a sum of two squares. Amer. Math. Monthly 97 (1990), no. 2, 144,

Notes

External links
Two more proofs at PlanetMath.org

Fermat's two squares theorem, D. R. Heath-Brown, 1984.

Additive number theory
Squares in number theory
Theorems in number theory